Popara (Cyrillic: попара, papara) is a dish made with bread. Typically the bread is old and has a thick crust, and is soaked in either hot tea, milk or water. Sugar, honey, butter, and cheese are often added. It is mostly made in  Bulgaria, Greece, Serbia, Bosnia and Herzegovina, North Macedonia, Turkey and Montenegro.

See also
 Tirit
 Tyurya

References

Bosnia and Herzegovina cuisine
Bulgarian cuisine
Greek cuisine
Macedonian cuisine
Montenegrin cuisine
Serbian cuisine
Turkish cuisine